Lancaster Inferno is a top level amateur women's soccer club based in Lancaster, Pennsylvania. Founded in 2008, the club fields a first team that plays in United Women's Soccer (UWS), a national  pro-am league at the second tier of the American Soccer Pyramid, and a U23 team that competes in UWS League Two.

Timeline
 2008: PA Classics starts Lancaster Inferno, a women's team playing in the WPSL (Women's Premier Soccer League), along with a men's team playing in the National Premier Soccer League, also called the Lancaster Inferno. The women are coached by Doug Harris. The home field is  Hempfield High School's athletic stadium in Landisville.
 2009: The men's team folds, but the women continue to compete. 
 2011: Inferno is no longer under the PA Classics umbrella, and plays under the sponsorship of the Penn Legacy Soccer Club. The team's name is changed to "Penn Legacy Inferno".
 2013: Inferno becomes independent, no longer associated with PA Classics or Penn Legacy. The team's name reverts to its former name, "Lancaster Inferno".
 2014: Lancaster Inferno is sold to Francisco Cleaves, who also begins operations as head coach.
 2015: Inferno changes its home field to Millersville University's Pucillo Field in the Lancaster suburb of Millersville.
 2016: Lancaster Inferno leaves WPSL and joins United Women's Soccer (UWS).
 2018: The team enters an agreement with Rush Soccer, to be recognized as the club's top level women's team. The team's name was changed to Inferno Rush, branding under the Rush Soccer brand, along with the USL's Penn FC. The Inferno became both the UWS East Conference Regular Season Champions, as well as beating the Connecticut Fusion to become the East Conference Playoff Champions. The Inferno went to the UWS National Championship held in Grand Rapids, Michigan and defeated Grand Rapids FC in the semi-final match. In the final match, Inferno faced the Houston Aces and lost 1-0 in extra time.
 2019: The agreement with Rush Soccer was terminated and the team reverted to its former name, "Lancaster Inferno".

Players

2021 First Team

2021 U23 Team

Notable former and present players 
  Kelly O'Brien: Lancaster Inferno (20172019) Diósgyőri VTK of the Hungarian Női Nemzeti Bajnokság
  Sonia Rada: Lancaster Inferno(2019), EN Thoi Lakatamia (Cyprus) 2018-2019, FF Lugano 1976 Lugano, Switzerland (2017-2018), 
  Emily Armstrong: Sundsvalls DFF (Sundsvalls damfotbollsförening), Sweden (present); IBV, in league Úrvalsdeild Kvenna, Iceland (2018); Medkila IL, Norway (2017); Lancaster Inferno (2016)
  Sydney Blomquist: Lancaster Inferno (2014 & 2016), Västerås BK30 (2016), Åland United (2017), Sporting CP (2019-present)
  Emily Dolan: Real Betis Balompié (Liga Iberdrola), Spain (2018present); KKPK Medyk Konin (Champions League & Ekstraliga), Poland (20172018); USD San Zaccaria/Ravenna Woman (Serie A), Italy (20162017); Lancaster Inferno (2016)
  Jade Flory: Lancaster Inferno (20132014), Prottur Reykjavik otherwise known as Throttur FC (Icelandic Women’s Premier Division) / Ravasens IK Karlskoga (Sweden)
  Tesa McKibben: Lancaster Inferno (20122014, 2017present); Germany's FC Saarbrücken (20142016); Germany's ETSV Wurzburg (2014)
  Teresa Rynier: Lancaster Inferno (20072010, 2016, 2018present); Ottawa Fury (2011 & 2014); FH Hafnafjördur, Iceland (2013); Kvarnsvedens IK, Sweden (2012)
  Kendra Jones: Lancaster Inferno (20102012, 2018present); Women's National Premier Leagues's FC Bulleen Lions & Bayside United FC in Melbourne Australia (20162017); Czech Republic's Zeny 1 Liga team AC Sparta Praha (2015); Victorian Premier League of Australia: Heidelberg United (20132014)
 Carol Sánchez: Independiente Santa Fe (Colombia) & the Costa Rica women's national football team  Lancaster Inferno (2016)

Team standings and statistics

Coaching staff
  Francisco Cleaves, Head Coach of First Team (2014–present)
  Rob Smith, Associate Head Coach of First Team (2020–present)
  Wendell Hannaford, Head Coach of U23 Team (2021–present)
  Chris Weibel, Strength & Conditioning Coach (2014–present)

Home stadiums
 Pucillo Field, Millersville University (2015–present)
Hempfield High School (2008–2014)

References

External links
 Official Website

Sports in Lancaster, Pennsylvania
Amateur soccer teams in Pennsylvania
Women's soccer clubs in the United States
Soccer clubs in Pennsylvania